The 1922–23 Idaho Vandals men's basketball team represented the University of Idaho during the  NCAA college basketball season. Members of the Pacific Coast Conference, the Vandals were led by third-year head coach  and played their home games on campus at the Armory and Gymnasium in Moscow, Idaho.

The PCC had expanded to eight teams the previous year and it was divided into two divisions for the first time, with five in the North and three in the South; the winners advanced to a best-of three playoff series. Idaho was led on the court by captain Rich Fox; "Bullet" became the head coach four years later.

Idaho tied with Washington in the Northern Division, so they met in a playoff game in Spokane, which the Vandals  The Huskies were led by UI alumnus and former head coach Hec Edmundson. California and Stanford tied for the Southern Division title, but since the Golden Bears had won three of four in the season series, the Cardinals opted out of a playoff and ceded the title.

California had hoped to play the championship series in Portland or Spokane, but the conference decided it was to be held on campus in Moscow; the Vandals won the first two games to successfully defend the   Idaho's last PCC crown; the only other division title came 23 years later in 1946, but they lost that playoff series at California in three games.

The Vandals' next conference title in basketball came 58 years later, in the Big Sky in 1981 (and 1982).

Postseason results

|-
!colspan=5 style=| PCC Northern Division Playoff

|-
!colspan=5 style=| Pacific Coast Conference Playoff Series

References

External links
Sports Reference – Idaho Vandals: 1922–23 basketball season
Idaho Argonaut – student newspaper – 1923 editions

Idaho Vandals men's basketball seasons
Idaho
Idaho
Idaho